The sociology of art is a subfield of sociology that explores the societal dimensions of art and aesthetics.

Studying the sociology of art throughout history is the study of the social history of art, how various societies contributed to the appearance of certain artists.

Key scholars in the sociology of art include Pierre Bourdieu, Vera Zolberg, Howard S. Becker, Arnold Hauser, and Harrison White.

Approaches 
In her 1970 book Meaning and Expression: Toward a Sociology of Art, Hanna Deinhard gives one approach: "The point of departure of the sociology of art is the question: How is it possible that works of art, which always originate as products of human activity within a particular time and society and for a particular time, society, or function -- even though they are not necessarily produced as 'works of art' -- can live beyond their time and seem expressive and meaningful in completely different epochs and societies? On the other hand, how can the age and society that produced them be recognized in the works"?Other approaches consider the social and economic background to the creation of works of art, which has been a great focus of art history in recent decades. For example, research has examined the role of gender and nationality of artists in museum exhibition and textbook inclusion. The role of patrons and consumers of art, as well as those of the artist(s) themselves, are considered. Work into the role geographic location of art collections/collectors has been shown to affect the prestige and recognition of collectors in the art world. There has also been a great interest in the history of art collecting, and the history of older objects between their creation and their current location, beyond a mere provenance. Recent work has also employed new analysis techniques such as social network analysis to understand how an artist's reputation can be affected by association with other artists in exhibition.

See also 
 Sociology of culture
 Anthropology of art
 Art world
 Art market
 Private collection
 Curator

References

Further reading 
Bourdieu, Pierre. The Rules of Art: Genesis and Structure of the Literary Field. Stanford University Press. 1996. 
Braden, Laura E. "From the Armory to academia: Careers and reputations of early modern artists in the United States." Poetics 37.5-6 (2009): 439-455.
Zolberg, Vera L., Constructing a Sociology of the Arts. Cambridge University Press. 1990. 
Deinhard, Hanna, Meaning and Expression: Toward a Sociology of Art. Beacon Press, Boston, 1970. 
 Becker, Howard S. Art Worlds. Berkeley: University of California Press, 1982.
 Raymonde Moulin The French Art Market, Rutgers University Press, 1987
 Nakajima, Seio. "Prosumption in Art." American Behavioral Scientist Vol. 56, No. 4 (April 2012): 550-569. 
 John Paul, Art as Weltanschauung: An Overview of Theory in the Sociology of Art. Electronic Journal of Sociology, 2005.
Alain Quemin, "Globalization and Mixing in the visual arts. An Empirical Survey of "High Culture" and Globalization", International Sociology, vol. 21, n°4, July 2006, p. 522-550.
Braden, L. E. (2016). Collectors and collections: Critical recognition of the world's top art collectors. Social Forces, 94(4), 1483-1507.
Harrison C. White and Cynthia A. White (1993), Canvases and Careers: Institutional Change in the French Painting World, University of Chicago Press, Chicago

Sociology of art
Visual arts
Visual anthropology